Aviotehas (1927–1939 named as Aviotöökoda) was a military unit and a company which dealt with constructing and repairing of military aircraft, based at Lasnamäe, Tallinn in Estonia.

Between 1927 and 1930, Aviotehas was part of the military unit Lennuväerügement.

Aircraft

References

Aircraft manufacturers
Aviation in Estonia
Tallinn